Ziarat Talash (زیارت تالاش) is the Head quarter, main Bazar, and central town of Tehsil Talash . It is situated in Lower Dir District . It is 20km distance from Chakdara and 21km away from Timergara.

See also 

 Lower Dir District

Lower Dir District
Union Councils of Lower Dir District